Canyon Ski Resort is located on the banks of the Red Deer River. It is located 9 km east of Red Deer, Alberta, Canada, along the David Thompson Highway.

It has one triple chair, one double chair, two T-bars, a platter tow and a tube tow.  Some of its main runs are the Powderhorn, Holiday, and Sun Deck.  The resort also hosts a snowboard Terrain Park and Super Pipe run. The vertical drop is 146 m (480 ft).

The main lodge is at the base of the ski runs and is located in a river valley, at the upper end of a steep road.  The upper lift stations are at the top of the river valley, in relatively flat prairie farmland.  While unloading at the top of the triple chairlift, you see a working oil pump jack and often cattle grazing immediately in front of you.

Canyon Ski Resort was one of the first Canadian ski hills to use artificial snow-making equipment in the 1960s.  As a result of this and relatively cold fall temperatures in central Alberta, it was reliably one of the first ski areas to open in Canada.  Consequently, the Canadian National Ski team used Canyon Ski Resort for its early season training in the 1960s. Canyon Ski Resport hosted the alpine skiing, freestyle skiing, and snowboarding events for the 2019 Canada Winter Games.

This ski resort offers runs for beginners to experienced skiers, including a "Bunny Hill" or beginners hill for young children.

References

External links
Canyon Ski Resort

Red Deer County
Ski areas and resorts in Alberta